Oscar Petersson (born 26 February 1999) is a Swedish footballer who plays as a midfielder for Landskrona BoIS.

References

External links 
 

1999 births
Living people
Association football midfielders
Swedish footballers
Sweden youth international footballers
Halmstads BK players
Landskrona BoIS players
Allsvenskan players
Superettan players
Ettan Fotboll players